History of the World, Part I is a 1981 American  comedy film written, produced, and directed by Mel Brooks. Brooks also stars in the film, playing five roles: Moses, Comicus the stand-up philosopher, Tomás de Torquemada, King Louis XVI, and Jacques, le garçon de pisse. The large ensemble cast also features Sid Caesar, Shecky Greene, Gregory Hines (in his film debut), Charlie Callas; and Brooks regulars Ron Carey, Dom DeLuise, Madeline Kahn, Harvey Korman, Cloris Leachman, Andreas Voutsinas, and Spike Milligan.

The film also has cameo appearances by Royce D. Applegate, Bea Arthur, Nigel Hawthorne, Hugh Hefner, John Hurt, Phil Leeds, Barry Levinson, Jackie Mason, Paul Mazursky, Andrew Sachs and Henny Youngman, among others. Orson Welles narrates each story.

Despite carrying the numeration Part I, there were originally no plans for a sequel. The title is a play on The History of the World by Sir Walter Raleigh, which was intended to be published in several volumes but only the first was completed. However, four decades later, Hulu announced the limited series History of the World, Part II, which premiered on March 6, 2023.

Plot

The film is a parody of the epic film genre, including the sword and sandal epic and the period costume drama subgenres. The four main segments consist of stories set during the Stone Age, the Roman Empire, the Spanish Inquisition, and the French Revolution. Other intermediate skits include reenactments of the giving of the Ten Commandments and the Last Supper.

The Stone Age
Cavemen (including Sid Caesar) depict the invention of fire, the first artist (which in turn gives rise to the first critic), the first marriages (Homo sapiens and then homosexual), primitive weapons (particularly spears), and the first funerals. Also depicted are early attempts at comedy and music, by smashing each other's feet with rocks and thus creating an orchestra of howls.

The Old Testament
Moses (Mel Brooks) comes down from Mount Sinai carrying three stone tablets, having received the Law from God (the voice of an uncredited Carl Reiner). As Moses announces the giving of the Law to the people, he drops one of the tablets, which shatters, and he "corrects" his proclamation from 15 Commandments to 10.

The Roman Empire
Comicus (Brooks) is a "stand-up philosopher", dispensing wisdom in the style of a stand-up comedian. He is notified by his agent Swiftus (Ron Carey) that he has landed a gig at Caesar's palace. En route, he meets and falls in love with a Vestal Virgin named Miriam (Mary-Margaret Humes) and befriends an Ethiopian slave named Josephus (Gregory Hines). 

Josephus is conscripted into the service of the Empress Nympho (Madeline Kahn). Comicus performs for Emperor Nero (Dom DeLuise), unwisely joking about the emperor's weight and corruption. Josephus absentmindedly pours a jug of wine into Nero's lap, and they are ordered to perform a gladiatorial fight to the death. They instead fight their way out of the palace, assisted by Miriam and Empress Nympho.

Comicus, Josephus, and Swiftus briefly take refuge in Nympho's palace, posing as eunuch guards. When Josephus' visible arousal exposes them as imposters, they are chased by soldiers led by Marcus Vindictus (Shecky Greene). They escape in a cart pulled by a horse named Miracle, lighting a huge marijuana joint to put the pursuing soldiers into a stupor.

They sail to Judea, where Comicus takes a job waiting tables, and blunders into a private room where Jesus is having the Last Supper with his disciples. Comicus interrupts Jesus (John Hurt) repeatedly (using his name in the modern sense, as an interjection). Leonardo da Vinci (Art Metrano) arrives to paint the group's portrait, directing them to all sit on the same side of the table, with Comicus behind Jesus, where his raised platter looks like a halo.

The Spanish Inquisition
The Spanish Inquisition segment parodies a grandiose Busby Berkeley-style production, consisting of an extended song-and-dance number featuring Brooks as the infamous Torquemada. The sequence opens with a herald introducing Torquemada and making a play on his name; despite pleas for mercy from the condemned, "you can't Torquemada anything" (talk him outta anything). Instances of comical torture include auto-da-fé, a spinning iron maiden, and "water torture" re-imagined with nuns performing an Esther Williams-style aquatic ballet. Jackie Mason and Ronny Graham supply cameos as Jewish torture victims.

The French Revolution
In her Paris tavern, Madame Defarge (Cloris Leachman) incites a mob to plot the French Revolution. Meanwhile, King Louis of France (Brooks) is warned by his advisors, Count de Monet (Harvey Korman) and Béarnaise (Andreas Voutsinas), that the peasants do not think he likes them — a suspicion reinforced by the king's use of peasants as targets in a game of skeet. A beautiful woman, Mademoiselle Rimbaud (Pamela Stephenson), asks King Louis to free her father, who has been imprisoned in the Bastille for 10 years, which he agrees to only if she will have sex with him that night.

De Monet persuades King Louis to go into hiding, and look-alike Jacques (also Brooks) – whose job is to hold buckets for the aristocrats to urinate into – is chosen to impersonate the king as a decoy. That night, Rimbaud visits Jacques – believing him to be Louis – to consummate the deal to free her father, but he pardons him without requiring sexual favors. After Rimbaud and her senile father (Spike Milligan) return from the prison, peasants burst into the room and take "King" Jacques to the guillotine. When Rimbaud exclaims that "only a miracle can save him", Josephus inexplicably arrives in the cart pulled by Miracle, and they escape, riding off toward a mountain carved with the words THE END.

Previews of coming attractions
The end of the film presents a mock teaser trailer for History of the World, Part II, "coming soon". The trailer is narrated by Brooks, and shows clips of segments "Hitler on Ice", "A Viking Funeral", and "Jews in Space" (a parody of Star Wars).

Cast

 Mel Brooks – Moses, Comicus, Torquemada, Jacques and King Louis XVI
 Dom DeLuise – Emperor Nero
 Madeline Kahn – Empress Nympho
 Harvey Korman – Count de Monet
 Cloris Leachman – Madame Defarge
 Ron Carey – Swiftus
 Gregory Hines – Josephus
 Pamela Stephenson – Mademoiselle Rimbaud
 Shecky Greene – Marcus Vindictus
 Sid Caesar – Chief Caveman
 Sammy Shore – Prehistoric Man
 Mary-Margaret Humes – Miriam
 Orson Welles – Narrator
 Carl Reiner – God (uncredited)

Ancient Rome cameos
 Howard Morris – Court Spokesman
 Charlie Callas – Soothsayer
 Paul Mazursky – Roman officer
 Henny Youngman – Chemist
 Hugh Hefner – Entrepreneur
 Barry Levinson – Column Salesman
 John Myhers – Leader of Senate
 Dena Dietrich – Competence
 Fritz Feld - Maitre d'
 John Hurt – Jesus
 Art Metrano – Leonardo da Vinci
 Bea Arthur – "Vnemployment Insvrance" Clerk (uncredited)
 Ronny Graham – Oedipus
 Pat McCormick – Plumbing Salesman

Spanish Inquisition cameos
 Ronny Graham – Jewish torture victim #1 
 Jackie Mason – Jewish torture victim #2

French Revolution cameos
 Andreas Voutsinas – Béarnaise 
 Spike Milligan – Monsieur Rimbaud
 Sydney Lassick – Applecore Vendor
 Jack Carter – Rat Vendor
 Jan Murray – Nothing Vendor
 John Hillerman – Rich Man
 Andrew Sachs – Gerard
 Fiona Richmond – Queen
 Nigel Hawthorne – Citizen Official
 Bella Emberg – Baguette

Production
Brooks recalled that the inspiration for the film came about from an incident in 1979:

Richard Pryor was to play the role of Josephus, but two days before he was to shoot his part he was hospitalized with serious burns in a much-publicized incident. Brooks was about to write the part out when Madeline Kahn suggested Gregory Hines. 
John Cleese was originally scheduled to play "Count de Monet" but due to scheduling conflicts Harvey Korman was instead cast.

Comicus' arrival at Caesar's palace was filmed at the Caesars Palace hotel in Las Vegas.

One scene was removed from the final cut of the film that referred to the Three Mile Island accident. "I had a father and a mother," Brooks said, "made up to look like half a dog and half a cat as a result of a nuclear meltdown. But the audience was seriously chilled and didn't laugh, so I left it out."

Release

Critical reception
The film holds an approval rating of 61% on Rotten Tomatoes, based on 33 reviews. The site's consensus reads: "History of the World Part 1 may not have enough comedic inspiration to merit a Part 2, but the sporadic cleverness of these anachronistic skits are still a testament to Mel Brooks' gift of farce". It was nominated for Worst Picture at the 1981 Stinkers Bad Movie Awards but lost to Tarzan, the Ape Man. The revised ballot, released in 2007, removed its Worst Picture nomination and instead nominated it for Most Painfully Unfunny Comedy (which it won). It also garnered a Worst Song nomination at the same ceremony for "The Inquisition" (lost to "Baby Talk" from Paternity).

Roger Ebert gave the film two stars out of four and described it as "a rambling, undisciplined, sometimes embarrassing failure from one of the most gifted comic filmmakers around. What went wrong? Brooks never seems to have a clear idea of the rationale of his movie, so there's no confident narrative impetus to carry it along." Gene Siskel, however, gave it three stars out of four and said that even though the film "borrows heavily from [Brooks'] previous work," it "contains a bunch of solid laughs." Janet Maslin of The New York Times wrote, "There are loads of familiarly funny gags in the film ... But the movie is so sour that its humor is often undermined, because so many of the jokes are either mean-spirited or scatological, or both." Pauline Kael of The New Yorker was positive and wrote, "It's an all-out assault on taste and taboo, and it made me laugh a lot." Variety called it "a disappointingly uneven farce which serves up a fair share of hearty laughs during its first half, but sputters out long before the close." Sheila Benson of the Los Angeles Times wrote, "Presumably everyone was so busy doing shtick and reacting off each other that there was no one left to mind the story and to say, 'Not funny.' Not only not funny, but a big, overblown, crashing bore, fellas." Gary Arnold of The Washington Post called it "an entertaining mishmash of skits which finds Mel Brooks back in lively form, for better and for worse ... To a considerable extent the funny stuff works in a laughing-in-spite-of-yourself way." Leonard Maltin's film guide gave the movie one-and-a-half out of a possible four stars and stated that the gags "range from hilarious to hideous. After a while there's no more momentum, and it all just lies there, despite the efforts of a large comic cast."

Jonathan Rosenbaum has always championed the film as a guilty pleasure, writing that "the wonderful stuff is so funny that it makes most of the awful stuff tolerable ... Keep in mind that Brooks is more verbal than visual in orientation and you'll be amply rewarded."

Box office
The film opened in 484 theatres the same weekend as Raiders of the Lost Ark and Clash of the Titans and finished fourth for the weekend with a gross of $4.8 million, behind Raiders, Clash and Cheech and Chong's Nice Dreams. With a per-screen average of $10,000, it was Brooks' highest opening on a per-screen basis. Despite the strong start, poor word of mouth impacted its box office. Although it grossed $31.7 million, it was considered a commercial disappointment because the film had been "tracking" well and Brooks' previous films had been so successful.

Home media
History of the World, Part I was released on DVD. According to the MPAA, it was rated "R" for "crude sexual humor, language, comic violence, sex and nudity, and drug use". In May 2010, it was released on Blu-ray.

Sequel series

On October 18, 2021, Hulu and Searchlight Television (the TV division of 20th Century's sister studio, Searchlight Pictures) announced that a sequel variety series, called History of the World, Part II was in the works, with production beginning in spring 2022. Mel Brooks is producing and writing the series along with Wanda Sykes, Ike Barinholtz, and Nick Kroll, who also star. It premiered on March 6, 2023.

References

External links

 
 
 
 

1981 films
20th Century Fox films
American musical comedy films
American parody films
American anthology films
Brooksfilms films
Portrayals of Moses in film
Portrayals of Jesus in film
Depictions of Nero on film
Cultural depictions of Tomás de Torquemada
Inquisition in fiction
Cultural depictions of Louis XVI
1980s English-language films
Films scored by John Morris
Films directed by Mel Brooks
Films produced by Mel Brooks
Films set in France
Films with screenplays by Mel Brooks
Films about gladiatorial combat
Films about cavemen
Films set in the Roman Empire
Films set in the 1st century
Films set in the 15th century
Films set in the 18th century
1980s musical comedy films
1980s parody films
1981 comedy films
1980s American films